This is a list of songs released by Prince and the New Power Generation on his then-official website NPG Music Club, released between 2001 and 2005. The list includes early radio transmissions (called "AHDIO SHOWS", usually mixed in sequence and containing a mix of old and new material, along with other artists'  material), digital singles, and albums of new material.

2001
Tracks marked with an ¤ are premium member bonuses.

Free giveaway tracks

Audio
"When Eye Lay My Hands On U" - Prince
NPGMC commercial

Video
NPGMC Intro Video

February

NPG Ahdio Show (Transmission #1)
Introduction - Tora Tora
"The Juice" - Carmen Electra
"Gothic Metal (Instr.)" - Jacob Armen
Segue - Tora Tora
"Love Sign (Ted’s Funky Chariot Remix)" - Prince with Nona Gaye
Segue - Tora Tora
"When Eye Lay My Hands On U" - Prince
Segue - Tora Tora
"High" - Prince
Segue - Rhonda Smith
"Calling To Say Goodbye" - Rhonda Smith
Segue - Rhonda Smith
"To The Teeth" - Ani DiFranco
"Mother Earth" - Rhonda Smith
"Spanish Coloured Romance" - Cindy Blackman
Segue - Morris Hayes
"My Medallion" - Prince
Segue
"Golden Parachute" - Prince
"Passing Your Name" - DVS
"Kamasutra Overture #8 (Remix)" - NPG Orchestra
Segue - Montalbo's Hair Studio (Commercial)
"Dance Un2 The Rhythm (Remix)" - Louie Louie
"I Like It There" - Prince
Segue - Tora Tora
"Days of Wild" (Live at Paisley Park, 23 October 1999) - Prince

Audio
"When Eye Lay My Hands On U" - Prince
"Peace" - Prince and the New Power Generation
"Funky Design" - Prince
"Mad" - Prince
"Splash" - Prince and the Revolution

Video
"U Make My Sun Shine" - Prince and Angie Stone
"When Eye Lay My Hands On U" - Prince

March

NPG Ahdio Show (Transmission #2)
Intro - Salome
"Groove On (Baby Let's Go)" - Larry Graham
Speech - Salome
"Silicon" - Prince
"Circle of Amour" - Prince
Salome Introduction
"We March (Live)" - Prince & The NPG
"Vicki Waiting (Live)" - Prince & The NPG
"Letitgo (Live)" - Prince & The NPG
Jazz Segue - Salome
NPGMC Promo Jingle / Speech
Segue - Femi Jiya
"Rowdy Mac" - The Fonky Baldheads
"Fonky Like a" -The Fonky Baldheads
"Can You Say Love" - Derek Hughes
"Soul Sanctuary" - Prince
"1, 2 ('The Future')" - Prince
Segue - Femi Jiya Interview
"My Computer" - Prince
Segue - NPG Audio
"Crazy Fingers" - Jacob Armen
"Dinner with Delores" - Prince
Instrumental Extro
Segue - NPG Audio

Audio
"We March (Live)" - Prince & The NPG
"Vicki Waiting (Live)" - Prince & The NPG
"Letitgo (Live)" - Prince & The NPG
"Return of The Bump Squad (Live)" - Prince & The NPG

Video
"Controversy/Mutiny (Live)" - Prince
"The Daisy Chain" - Prince & The NPG

April

NPG Ahdio Show (Transmission #3)
"Murph Drag" - The Time
"The Ballad of Dorothy Parker" - Prince
"The Work (Part 1)" - Prince
"Superfunkycalifragisexy (Instr.)" - Prince
"Intellipop (Instr.)" - Rhonda Smith
"Dandelion" - Millenia
"Imagine That" - Ani DiFranco
"O.K." by Ani DiFranco
"America (Live '86)" - Prince & The Revolution
Segue - "Do It Right"
"Chaos and Disorder" - Prince
"Sex Me, Sex Me Not" - Prince
Segue
"Eye'magettin'" - Larry Graham
"Northside" - Prince
Extro

Audio
"Northside" - Prince
"Habibi" - Prince1
"The Work, Pt. 1" - Prince
"The Daisy Chain" - Prince & The NPG¤

1 - Live cover of "Machine Gun" by Jimi Hendrix

May

NPG Ahdio Show (Transmission #4)
"Props N' Pounds" - Prince
Segue - "Celebration" announcement: The Rainbow Children + Greatest Hits
"Christopher Tracy's Parade (Live)" - Prince and the Revolution
"New Position (Live)" - Prince and the Revolution
"I Wonder U (Live)" - Prince and the Revolution
"Raspberry Beret (Live)" - Prince and the Revolution
"Delirious (Live)" - Prince and the Revolution
"Controversy (Live)" - Prince and the Revolution
"A Love Bizarre (Live)" - Prince and the Revolution
"Hit U in the Socket" - Rosie Gaines
"Strange Relationship (Live)" - Prince
"Get Wild (Live)" - Prince & The NPG
"Damn U (Live)" - Prince & The NPG
"The Max (Live)" - Prince & The NPG
Segue - Commercial
"This Crazy Life of Mine" - Chaka Khan
Segue - Commercial
"Johnny (Live)" - Prince & The NPG
Segue
Extro

Audio
"Props N' Pounds" - Prince
"Hit U in the Socket" - Rosie Gaines
"Sex In My Bones" - The Fonky Bald Heads

Video
"Get Wild (Per4mance)" - The NPG
"The Work, Pt. 1 (Live)" - Prince
"I Could Never Take The Place of Your Man / Summertime (Live)" - Prince¤
"The Ballad of Dorothy Parker / Four (Live)" - Prince¤

June

NPG Ahdio Show (Transmission #5)
Intro - Salome
"The Rainbow Children" - Prince
"Pop My Clutch" - Chaka Khan
Segue - Salome
"Family Name" - Prince
"Race (Alt.)" - Prince
Segue - Salome
"Sometimes It Snows in April" - Prince and the Revolution
Segue - Salome
"Eye Hate U (Quiet Nite Mix)" - Prince
"Heaven Must Be Near" - Ingrid Chavez
Segue
"The Most Beautiful Girl In The World (Mustang Mix)" - Prince
Segue - Geneva
"The Future (William Orbit Remix)" - Prince
Segue - Geneva
"The Good Life (Big City Remix)" - The NPG
"The Digital Garden" - Prince
"Deep" - N'Dambi
Segue - Geneva
"Goldie's Parade" - The NPG
"Violet The Organ Grinder" - Prince
Segue
"Six" - Madhouse
"Seven" - Madhouse
"Eight" - Madhouse
Extro

Audio
"Sex Me, Sex Me Not" - Prince
"Supercute" - Prince
"Y Should Eye Do That When Eye Can Do This?" - Prince¤

Video
"Prettyman (Live)" - Prince and the NPG
"Baby Knows (Live)" - Prince
"The Ride (Live)" - Prince¤

July

NPG Ahdio Show (Transmission #6)
Intro: Celebration 2001 thank U's + snippets from performances
"We gon' make it funky" - Maceo Parker
"The light" - Maceo Parker
"Alright with me" - Erykah Badu
"Throw your hands up" - Fonky Baldheads
"Jerk out" - The Time
"How come U don't call me" - Alicia Keys
"Give it up or turn it loose / Sex machine" - Common
"(Get) Her Way" - Kip Blackshire
"U Can Touch Me" - Autobox
"Dance with Me" - Kip Blackshire
SEGUE
"Baby Knows" - Prince
Segue - Salsa and peppers Intro (Jacob Armen)
"Get Wild (Money Maker Funky Jazz Mix)" - The NPG
"Asswhuppin' in a trunk (Instr.)" - Madhouse
"Blood is thicker than time" - Mavis Staples
Segue
"Rock 'n' Roll is Alive! (and it lives in Minneapolis)" - Prince
Segue
"Cream (NPG Mix)" - Prince and the NPG
"Things Have Gotta Change (Tony M. Rap)" - Prince and the NPG
"My Name Is Prince (House Mix)" - Prince and the NPG
Segue
"2 Whom It May Concern" - Prince and the NPG
"The Other Side of the Pillow" - Prince
"The One (Remix)" - The NPG
Outro

Audio
"S&M Groove" - Prince
"Van Gogh" - Prince
"Hypno Paradise" - Prince
"Instrumental" - Prince

Video
"Endorphinmachine (Live)" - Prince
"One Song" - Prince

August

NPG Ahdio Show (Transmission #7)
Intro ("Judas Kiss" - Prince)
"The good life (Platinum People Mix)" - The NPG
"Shall we dance" - Brownmark
"Kain't turn back" - Mavis Staples
"Higher than high" - Tony LeMans
"High" - Prince
"Good Judy girlfriend" - Carmen Electra
Segue - NPG Ahdio
"100 M.P.H" - Mazarati
Segue
Live Medley - Prince and the Revolution:
"Automatic"
"DMSR"
"The Dance Electric"
Segue - NPG Ahdio
"The drama" - Chaka Khan
"Whispering dandelions" - Ingrid Chavez
"Standing at the altar" - Margie Cox
Segue
"The greatest romance ever sold (Jason Nevin Ext. Remix" - Prince
Outro ("Judas Kiss" - Prince)

Audio
"Judas Kiss" - Prince1
"Get Wild (Miami Mix)" - The NPG
"Horny Pony" - Prince and the NPG
"Golden Parachute (Long Version)" - Prince¤

Video
"Bambi (Live)" - Prince and the NPG

1 - Retitled "Judas Smile"

September

NPG Ahdio Show (Transmission #8)
Intro:
"Love, Thy will be done (Prince Mix)" - Martika
"Eye No" - Prince
"The Cross" - Prince
"The Plan" - The NPG Orchestra
"The Plan" - The NPG Orchestra
"Anna Stesia" - Prince
"Elephants and Flowers" - Prince
"Eye Wish U Heaven" - Prince
"Love, Thy will be Done (Prince Mix)" - Martika
"Pearls B4 the swine" - Prince
"7 (Acoustic Version)" - Prince and the NPG
"Space (Universal Love Remix)" - Prince
"Still would Stand all time" - Prince
"Into the Light" - Prince
"I Will" - Prince
"The Holy River" - Prince
Outro:
"The Plan" - The NPG Orchestra
"Positivity" - Prince

Audio
"My Medallion" - Prince
"Thieves In The Temple (Remix) - Prince
"Rebirth of the Flesh (Rehearsal '88) - Prince
"Contest Song (Instrumental)" - The NPG¤

Video
"If I Was Ur Girlfriend (Live)" - Prince and the NPG

October
All members got a download of "The Rainbow Children"; premium members could download both a low and high-quality MP3 (the entire album as one file) starting October 17th, while basic members got the low-quality MP3 starting November 1st. See the album article for more details.

November

NPG Ahdio Show (Transmission #9)
"The Rainbow Children/Last December" excerpts with various fan comments about the album
"(Jukebox with a) Heartbeat" - Prince
"The Stick (Updated Version)" - The Time
"Do it all night" - Prince
Segue - Pay Girl Rap
Segue - "Release It!" Intro
"Jungle Jazz" - Jacob Armen
"Willing and able" - Prince & The NPG
"Northside Jam (Rehearsal/Live)" - The NPG
"Real thing" - Tony LeMans
"Love on a blue train (Live)" - Sheila E.
Live NY medley - Prince:
"Let's Go Crazy"
"Kiss
"Irresistible Bitch"
"She's Always In My Hair"
"When You Were Mine"
"Insatiable"
"Scandalous"
Outro

Audio
"Vavoom" - Prince
"Underneath the Cream" - Prince
"Live 4 Love (Live)" - Prince and the NPG
"The Undertaker (Live)" - Prince
"We Gon' Make It Funky (Live)" - Maceo Parker and Prince¤

NPGMC "Contest Song" Choices
"Where Are Your Dandelions?" - Dana D.
"How Could I Love You More?" - Miles Rivers
"No War" - The Muse

Video
"Live 4 Love (Live)" - Prince and the NPG
"The Undertaker (Live)" - Prince and the NPG
"Love Sign" - Prince and Nona Gaye
"We Gon' Make It Funky (Live)" - Maceo Parker and Prince¤

December

NPG Ahdio Show (Transmission #10)
Intro
"New Power Soul" - The NPG
"Face Down (X-tended Rap Money Mix)" - Prince
"18 & Over" - Prince
"My Medallion" - Prince
"Groove On" - Larry Graham
"Mad Sex" - The NPG
"Gett Off" - Prince and the NPG
"I Rock, There4 I Am"
"Partyup" - Prince
"Controversy" - Prince
"Peace" - The NPG
Outro

Audio
"Gamillah" - Prince
"Silicon" - Prince
"High" - Prince
"Poorgoo (Live)" - Prince
"Gett Off (Live)" - Prince and the NPG¤

Video
"Poor Goo (Live)" - Prince
"Dolphin" - Prince
"Gett Off (Live)" - Prince and the NPG¤

2002

January

NPG Ahdio Show (Transmission #11)
Intro
Mega-Mix by DJ Dudley D:
"The human body"
"Hot with U"
"New World"
"Partyman"
"Raspberry beret" (12" Remix)
"High"
"Undisputed (The Moneyopolis Mix)"
"Prettyman"
"The Work, Pt. 1"
"The Question of U" (live/rehearsal)
"Face Down/The Undertaker" (live/rehearsal)
"Courtin' Time" (live/rehearsal)

Audio
"A Case of U" - Prince
"Breathe" - Prince
"Madrid 2 Chicago" - Prince
"Anotherloverholenyohead (Live)" - Prince and the Revolution
"Face Down (Per4mance)" - Prince and the NPG
"U're Gonna C Me" - Prince¤
"Here On Earth" - Prince¤
"One Nite Alone" - Prince¤

Video
"Anotherloverholenyohead (Live)" - Prince and the Revolution
"Face Down (Per4mance)" - Prince and the NPG
"Prince - Musical Portrait"¤

March
"Silicon" - Prince

July
"1+1+1=3 (Live)" - Prince and the NPG

2003

January
Xpectation
C-Note

April (Relaunch)
During the relaunch, no downloads were given. Any new music was streamed online.

2004

March
"Bataclan"
"Controversy (Live in Hawaii)"
The Slaughterhouse
The Chocolate Invasion

April
"Magnificent"
"Reflection (Live)" (Video)

July
"The United States of Division"
"Silver Tongue (Demo)"

September
"Musicology (Live, Much Music)" (Video)
"Kiss (Live, Much Music)" (Video)
"D.M.S.R. (Live, Much Music)" (Video)

October
"San Jose Jam (Live)"
"Glass Cutter (Demo)"

2005

March
Live from Paisley Park
"Strange Relationship (Live)"
"Satisfied (Live)"

April
"Glasscutter"

September
S.S.T. single

External links
DawNation - Independent guide

Prince (musician)
Works by Prince (musician)
Prince (musician) songs
Songs written by Prince (musician)